Cnemaspis pseudomcguirei, also known as the false McGuire's rock gecko, is a species of gecko endemic to Malaysia.

References

Cnemaspis
Reptiles described in 2009